The Parque Villa Del Rey is a 1,200-seat association football stadium in Caguas, Puerto Rico. As of the 2018-19 Liga Puerto Rico season, it hosts the home matches of Caguas Sporting FC.

References

External links
Soccerway profile

Football venues in Puerto Rico